Cristian Saracco (born 11 April 1976) is an Italian cross-country skier. He competed in the men's 15 kilometre classical event at the 2002 Winter Olympics.

Cross-country skiing results
All results are sourced from the International Ski Federation (FIS).

Olympic Games

World Championships

World Cup

Season standings

References

External links
 

1976 births
Living people
Italian male cross-country skiers
Olympic cross-country skiers of Italy
Cross-country skiers at the 2002 Winter Olympics
Sportspeople from Turin